Toronaeus sumptuosus is a species of beetle in the family Cerambycidae. It was described by Lane in 1973.

References

Acanthocinini
Beetles described in 1973